Heat is an original novel based on the television series Buffy the Vampire Slayer and Angel. Tagline: "An original crossover novel based on the hit television series created by Joss Whedon & David Greenwalt"

Plot summary
Buffy and Angel both battle the same ancient evil, a Possessor who was once Qin, First Emperor of China. As a Possessor, Qin's body loses its temperature fast and he is forced to jump from body to body through the ages, rendering him immortal. In present-day Sunnydale and Los Angeles, Qin is attempting to usher in the Year of the Hot Devil and drive humans out of his dimension by resurrecting an ancient dragon frozen in ice from centuries before.

Continuity
Set during Buffy season 7, and Angel season 4.  References in the book place it after the sixth episode of each series ("Him" and "Spin the Bottle" respectively).
Buffyverse canon characters include: Buffy, Angel, Cordelia, Spike, Jhiera
Jhiera, who previously appeared in Angel episode She, appears throughout.

Canonical issues
Buffy/Angel books such as this one are not usually considered by fans as canonical. Some fans consider them stories from the imaginations of authors and artists, while other fans consider them as taking place in an alternative fictional reality. However unlike fan fiction, overviews summarising their story, written early in the writing process, were 'approved' by both Fox and Joss Whedon (or his office), and the books were therefore later published as officially Buffy/Angel merchandise.  Yet, in light of the verbal ret-con given by George Lucas, when Marvel/Disney bought the rights to the Star Wars film franchise, the permanence of such officiality is understandably dubious.

External links

Reviews
Litefoot1969.bravepages.com - Review of this book by Litefoot
Nika-summers.com - Review of this book by Nika Summers

Books based on Buffy the Vampire Slayer
2004 American novels
2004 fantasy novels
Angel (1999 TV series) novels